Salaga Bhairavi (sālaga bhairavi) is a rāgam in Carnatic music (musical scale of South Indian classical music). It is a janya rāgam (derived scale) from the 22nd melakarta scale Kharaharapriya. It is a janya scale, as it does not have all the seven swaras (musical notes) in the ascending scale. It is a combination of the pentatonic scale Shuddha Saveri and the sampurna raga scale Kharaharapriya.

According to the Muthuswami Dikshitar school, this scale is of shadava-sampoorna type derived from Kharaharapriya scale.

Structure and Lakshana 

Salaga Bhairavi is an asymmetric rāgam that does not contain gandharam or nishadham in the ascending scale. It is an audava-sampurna rāgam (or owdava rāgam, meaning pentatonic ascending scale). Its ārohaṇa-avarohaṇa structure (ascending and descending scale) is as follows:

ārohaṇa : 
avarohaṇa : 

The notes used in this scale are shadjam, chatusruti rishabham, shuddha madhyamam, panchamam and chatusruti dhaivatam in ascending scale, with kaisiki nishadham and sadharana gandharam included in descending scale. For the details of the notations and terms, see swaras in Carnatic music.

Popular compositions

There are many compositions set to Salaga Bhairavi rāgam.

Padavini sadbhakti and Elatare mettu kontivi composed by Tyagaraja
Tyagarajena samrakshitoham by Muthuswamy Dikshitar
dandini shri candikambe , shrikantha dayanidhe by Muthiah Bhagavatar
Unnai Maravaamal by Vedanayagam Pillai
Kola Mayil Yerum by N S Chidambaram
Dashagresha by Madurai G S Mani 
kalinga-mardana nanda-gopa , Nagarajam and shailaja-ramana by Bangalore S Mukund
Lalite sura-vinute in tishra triputa thalam composed by R Vishveshwaran
namo namo dasharathe by R Venugopal
pahi parama-guru raghavendraya bhakta-anugrahaya by R K Suryanarayana
radha-ramana by E S Shankaranarayana Iyer
saketa-rajakumara by R N Duraiswamy 
tunga-tira-virajam shri raghavendra gururajam by Kamalesha Vittaladasa

Related rāgams 
This section covers the theoretical and scientific aspect of this rāgam.

Graha Bhedam 
Dhanyasi can be derived from Salaga Bhairavi when sung from Rishabham to Rishabham.

Scale similarities 
Salaga Bhairavi scale as per Dikshitar school uses sadharana gandharam in ascending scale, and also has a vakra prayoga (zig-zag usage of P D2 P). Its ārohaṇa-avarohaṇa structure is S R2 G2 M1 P D2 P S : S N2 D2 P M1 G2 R2 S
Shuddha Saveri, has a symmetric pentatonic scale, with the notes same as the ascending scale of Salaga Bhairavi. Its ārohaṇa-avarohaṇa structure is S R2 M1 P D2 S : S D2 P M1 R2 S
Yadukula Kambhoji has antara gandharam in descending scale, instead of sadharana gandharam (descending scale of Harikambhoji, instead of descending scale of Kharaharapriya). Its ārohaṇa-avarohaṇa structure is S R2 M1 P D2 S : S N2 D2 P M1 G3 R2 S

Notes

References 

Janya ragas
Janya ragas (kharaharapriya)